The dagger-axe is a type of pole weapon that was in use from the Erlitou culture until the Han dynasty in China. It consists of a dagger-shaped blade, mounted by its tang to a perpendicular wooden shaft. The earliest dagger-axe blades were made of stone. Later versions used bronze. Jade versions were also made for ceremonial use. There is a variant type with a divided two-part head, consisting of the usual straight blade and a scythe-like blade.

History 
The dagger-axe was the first weapon in Chinese history that was not also a dual-use tool for hunting (such as the bow and arrow) or agriculture. Lacking a point for thrusting, the dagger-axe was used in the open where there was enough room to swing its long shaft. Its appearance on the Chinese battlefield predated the use of chariots and the later dominance of tightly packed infantry formations. 

During the Zhou dynasty, the ji or Chinese halberd gradually became more common on the battlefield. The ji was developed from the dagger-axe by adding a spear head to the top of the shaft, thereby enabling the weapon to be used with a thrusting motion as well as a swinging motion. Later versions of the ji, starting in the Spring and Autumn period, combined the dagger-axe blade and spear head into a single piece. 

By the Han dynasty, the more versatile ji had completely replaced the dagger-axe as a standard infantry weapon. The ji was later replaced by the spear as the primary polearm of the Chinese military. By the Warring States period, large masses of infantry fighting in close ranks using the spear or ji had displaced the small groups of aristocrats on foot or mounted in chariots who had previously dominated the battlefield.

Archaeology
Many excavated dagger-axes are ceremonial jade weapons found in the tombs of aristocrats. These examples are often found within coffins, possibly meant to serve as emblems of authority and power, or in some other ritualistic capacity. Sometimes they are found in a pit dug beneath a coffin, with a victim who was sacrificed to guard the tomb, where they presumably are intended to keep the spirit-guard armed. Normally only the head of a dagger-axe is found, with the shaft absent because of either decomposition or mechanical removal. Although the jade examples do not appear to have been intended for use in actual combat, their morphology closely imitates that of the battle-ready bronze version, including a sharp central ridge which reinforces the blade. Some dagger-axe artifacts are small and curved and could have been intended for use as pendants.

Gallery

See also
 Bec de corbin
 Bill (weapon)

References

Bibliography

External links
Dagger-axe with hook, fragment - Freer and Sackler Galleries, Smithsonian Institution (Wayback Machine copy)

Ancient weapons
Axes
Blade weapons
Chinese inventions
Chinese melee weapons
Spears
Jade